Anders Thomas Steen (born June 8, 1960) is a Swedish former professional ice hockey player and coach. Steen is the former city councillor for the Winnipeg ward of Elmwood-East Kildonan. Steen played professional ice hockey in the Elitserien, National Hockey League and Deutsche Eishockey Liga. In his time in the NHL, he spent the entirety of his career with the original Winnipeg Jets.

Ice hockey career
Steen was born in Grums, Sweden, and began his career with Grums IK (1975–76). He later played for the elite Leksands IF (1976–80) and Färjestads BK (1980–81).  Swedish coach Tommy Sandlin described him as "a particularly intelligent and competent player".  He was drafted by the Sudbury Wolves of the Ontario Hockey League in 1978, but never played for the team.

Steen was drafted by the National Hockey League's Winnipeg Jets in 1979, as their fifth-round choice.  He was signed two years later by John Ferguson, and went on to become one of the most prolific players in the team's history.  Steen played a total of 950 regular season NHL games, scoring 264 goals and receiving 553 assists.  In a 1987 interview, he said that his focus was on creating plays for others rather than scoring goals himself.  A 1990 poll of NHL players named him as the league's most underrated player.  Steen continued to play for the Swedish national team in World Championship games throughout his NHL career, and won silver medals at the 1981 World Championship in Gothenburg and the 1986 World Championship in Moscow.

There were discussions about Steen being traded to the Toronto Maple Leafs in early 1994, but these ultimately came to nothing.  His record of playing fourteen seasons with only one team is unusual in modern North American professional sports.  Steen retired in 1995, and his jersey number 25 was retired by the Jets.  The number is still considered retired by the Jets' successor team, the Arizona Coyotes.  A 2005 article in the National Post newspaper listed him as the second greatest player in the history of the Winnipeg Jets franchise, after Dale Hawerchuk.  Unlike many professional hockey players, Steen was known throughout his career for his thoughtful responses to interview questions.

Steen worked with Manitoba Entertainment Complex Inc. in 1994, when the group was attempting to find a new downtown arena for the Jets. Some players questioned his judgement in this matter: failed labour negotiations had led to NHL players being locked out, and some believed it was a conflict of interest for Steen to promote a project supported by management.  Others supported Steen's decision, arguing that he was acting in the best interests of the team.

He came out of retirement in 1996, playing seven regular season and playoff games for the Frankfurt Lions of the Deutsche Eishockey Liga at the end of their season.  He then played three seasons for Eisbären Berlin before retiring again in 1999.  Coincidentally, he announced his retirement on the same day as Wayne Gretzky.  In January 2001, he was named European pro scout for the Minnesota Wild.  He moved back to Winnipeg in the mid-2000s at the behest of his employer, and scouted talent in the American Hockey League.

Shortly after losing a 2008 election in Manitoba (see below), Steen returned to Sweden as an assistant coach for Modo Hockey of the Elitserien. Steen, however, later did return to Winnipeg and won a seat on the city council.

One of Steen's sons, Alexander Steen, is also a former professional hockey player who most recently played for the St. Louis Blues, playing left wing and serving as an alternate captain, also having won the Stanley Cup with the team in 2019.

Charity and investments
Steen oversaw charity golf tournaments during and after his hockey career, with some proceeds going to children's charities.  In 1993, he helped set up an organization of five Junior Jets teams in Winnipeg for younger players.  In 2006, Steen and his son Alexander established an annual golf tournament to raise money for the Children's Hospital Foundation of Manitoba.

Steen and two partners purchased 50% ownership in the International Hockey League's Minnesota Moose team in 1996 and brought the franchise to Winnipeg the following year as the Manitoba Moose.  He ultimately decided not to oversee the team in an ownership capacity and was appointed as director of player development.  In 1997, he partnered with the team to create the Thomas Steen/Manitoba Moose Hockey School.

In 2006, Steen took part in a shareholder and creditor action against the directors of Maple Leaf Distillers and Protos International, seeking to have them repay $1.75 million invested over the last six years. The action alleged that the directors had unfairly disregarded the interests of shareholders and used company money for personal expenses. They denied the charges. Steen indicated that he felt betrayed by the directors, whom he previously considered to be personal friends. In March 2007, the presiding justice found in favour of the shareholders and creditors and ordered the directors to pay $875,000. The decision was upheld on appeal, and the Supreme Court of Canada later declined to review the case.

Many of the same investors later sued the Astra Credit Union, alleging that it was part of a "cheque-kiting" scheme that allowed the aforementioned directors to access millions of dollars in unauthorized loans. Astra initially rejected the charges as without merit. Later, Astra launched a third-party claim against its former chief credit officer and the former directors of Maple Leaf Distillers.

Steen donated an abstract painting/collage entitled Blood, Sweat, Tears, and A Lot of Love to a charity auction in Winnipeg in 2007.

Political career
Steen indicated that he was considering a political career in January 2007, when he appeared at a news conference as a guest of federal Conservative cabinet minister Vic Toews.  He later stood beside provincial Progressive Conservative leader Hugh McFadyen during the 2007 election, for an announcement that the PCs would bring NHL hockey back to Winnipeg if elected.  The governing New Democrats described this promise as unrealistic, as did many in the local media.  The New Democrats were returned with a majority government on election day. In a somewhat ironic twist, the NHL returned to Winnipeg in the final months of the NDP's 2007-11 term.

Steen was a candidate for the Conservative Party of Canada in the 2008 federal election, losing to New Democrat Jim Maloway in the northeast Winnipeg riding of Elmwood—Transcona.  His opponents argued that Steen, who lives in south Winnipeg, was unfamiliar with issues pertaining to the riding.  He was also criticized for missing several debates, and for only reading from written briefings during a debate at Kildonan East Collegiate.  One journalist, writing that Steen was "by all accounts and appearances a lovely and honourable gentleman", also noted that he was "radically out of his depth, muzzled by his party and unfamiliar with the issues".

Two years after that election (with a coaching stint in Sweden in the interim), on October 27, 2010, Steen won election to Winnipeg City Council, representing the Elmwood/East Kildonan ward, in the 2010 municipal election. He was defeated in the 2014 election by Jason Schreyer, the son of former Manitoba premier and Canadian governor general Ed Schreyer.

Controversy
In May 2014, Steen was charged with assault and uttering threats in connection with an alleged domestic violence incident with a woman at a Winnipeg restaurant in May. Steen took a leave from city council and was suspended from his role with the Winnipeg Police Board while the investigation into the charges took place. He was defeated in his bid for reelection to Winnipeg city council in October later in the year.

A condition put upon Steen in relation to those charges was a "no contact" order with relation to the alleged victim. Steen violated that condition in July 2014 and was briefly jailed as a result.

In October 2016 it was reported the charges were stayed in June of that year, meaning that though the Crown is no longer actively prosecuting the case charges can be brought back within one year if the Crown decides to pursue them again.

Awards and achievements
European Junior Championship Gold Medalists (1977)
World Junior Silver Medalists (1978)
World Junior Bronze Medalists (1979)
World Junior First All-Star Team (1979)
World Junior Bronze Medalists (1980)
Sweden Elitserien Player of Year (1981)
Swedish World All-Star Team (1981, 1985, & 1986)
Swedish Championship (1981)
World Championship Silver Medalist (1981 & 1986)
Played in the Canada Cup (1981, 1984, & 1991)
Selected to the NHL All-Star Game (1990)
The Winnipeg Jets retired his number 25 in 1995
“Honoured Member” of the Manitoba Hockey Hall of Fame
Member of the Manitoba Sports Hall of Fame

Electoral record

Career statistics

Regular season and playoffs

International

See also
Notable families in the NHL

References

External links

1960 births
Living people
Arizona Coyotes scouts
Canadian people of Swedish descent
Canadian sportsperson-politicians
Conservative Party of Canada candidates for the Canadian House of Commons
Eisbären Berlin players
Färjestad BK players
Frankfurt Lions players
Leksands IF players
Minnesota Wild scouts
National Hockey League players with retired numbers
Naturalized citizens of Canada
Swedish expatriate ice hockey players in Canada
Swedish expatriate ice hockey players in Germany
Swedish ice hockey centres
Winnipeg city councillors
Winnipeg Jets (1972–1996) captains
Winnipeg Jets (1979–1996) draft picks
Winnipeg Jets (1979–1996) players